Zuidwijk is a former municipality in the Dutch province of South Holland.

Zuidwijk was a separate municipality between 1817 and 1846, when it became part of Boskoop.

Since 2014 Boskoop has been a part of Alphen aan den Rijn.

References

Former municipalities of South Holland
Alphen aan den Rijn